See also Mount Giles (Antarctica)

It can be visited via the celebrated Larapinta Trail and has views of Mount Sonder, Ormiston Gorge and Pound, and the surrounding range.

See also

List of mountains in Australia

References

External links
Google Maps satellite image of Mount Giles

Giles